Kaloyan Levterov (born 8 February 2003) is a Bulgarian swimmer. He competed in the men's 100 metre backstroke at the 2020 Summer Olympics.

References

External links
 

2003 births
Living people
Bulgarian male swimmers
Olympic swimmers of Bulgaria
Swimmers at the 2020 Summer Olympics
Place of birth missing (living people)
21st-century Bulgarian people